Charles Burpee (June 18, 1817 – November 29, 1909) was a New Brunswick farmer and political figure. He represented Sunbury in the House of Commons of Canada from 1867 to 1887 as a Liberal member. He was a member of the Senate of Canada representing New Brunswick in 1900.

He was born in Sheffield, Sunbury County, New Brunswick in 1817 and grew up there. His family had settled there around 1763 after leaving Massachusetts. Burpee served on the provincial board of agriculture from 1864 to 1865. He married Charlotte Perley Hayward. Burpee was named to the Senate on February 1, 1900 and resigned on July 19 in the same year.

References 

1817 births
1909 deaths
Canadian senators from New Brunswick
Liberal Party of Canada MPs
Liberal Party of Canada senators
Members of the House of Commons of Canada from New Brunswick